Massimo Moia (born 9 March 1987) is a Belgian football midfielder, who currently plays for Grâce-Hollogne in Belgium.

External links
 Guardian Football
 

1987 births
Living people
Belgian footballers
FC Sochaux-Montbéliard players
K.A.A. Gent players
R. Charleroi S.C. players
Sint-Truidense V.V. players
A.F.C. Tubize players
C.S. Visé players
Belgian Pro League players
Challenger Pro League players
Belgian expatriate footballers
Expatriate footballers in France
Association football midfielders